Pilot Rock may refer to:

Pilot Rock, Butler County, Iowa, a populated place
Pilot Rock, Cherokee County, Iowa, a former post office
Pilot Rock, Oregon, a city in Umatilla County
Pilot Rock (Jackson County, Oregon), a volcanic plug